"Silly Love Songs" is a song by the British–American rock band Wings that was written by Paul and Linda McCartney. The song first appeared in March 1976 on the album Wings at the Speed of Sound, then it was released as a single backed with "Cook of the House" on 1 April in the US, and 30 April in the UK. The song, which features disco overtones, was written in response to music critics accusing McCartney of predominantly writing "silly love songs" and "sentimental slush".

The song was McCartney's 27th number one as a songwriter; the all-time record for the most number one hits achieved by a songwriter. With this song, McCartney became the first person to have a year-end No. 1 song as a member of two distinct acts. McCartney previously hit No. 1 in the year-end Billboard chart as a member of the Beatles with "I Want to Hold Your Hand" in 1964 and "Hey Jude" in 1968.

"Silly Love Songs" has since appeared on multiple McCartney greatest hits compilations, including Wings Greatest and All the Best! The song has also appeared on the "Hits" section of the compilation album Wingspan: Hits and History. Despite its popularity, McCartney has not performed the song live since the dissolution of Wings.

Background
"Silly Love Songs" was written as a rebuttal to music critics who had criticized McCartney for writing lightweight love songs. Author Tim Riley suggests that in the song, McCartney is inviting "his audience to have a laugh on him," as Elvis Presley had sometimes done.

The song includes a build-up of multiple vocal parts sung in counterpoint, similar to the Beach Boys' "God Only Knows", a song that McCartney cited as his favourite of all time.  McCartney allowed the horn section to create their own parts for the song.

Release
"Silly Love Songs" was released in the US on 1 April 1976 and spent five non-consecutive weeks at number 1 on the Billboard Hot 100. The song was the number 1 pop song in Billboard's Year-End Charts of 1976; it was also the group's second of three number ones on the Easy Listening chart. The single was certified Gold by the Recording Industry Association of America for sales of over one million copies. Billboard listed "Silly Love Songs" as Paul McCartney's all-time biggest Hot 100 single.

The single was released in the UK on 30 April 1976 and reached number 2 on the UK Singles Chart. The song reached No. 1 upon the Irish Singles Chart on 27 May.

Critical reception
Upon release, "Silly Love Songs" generally received positive reviews from music critics, despite a common criticism of the song lacking substance. AllMusic'''s Stephen Thomas Erlewine described the song, as well as its follow-up single, "Let 'Em In", as "so lightweight that their lack of substance seems nearly defiant". Music critic Robert Christgau called the two tracks "charming if lightweight singles", while Rolling Stone critic Stephen Holden said "Silly Love Songs" was "a clever retort whose point is well taken".  Cash Box said that "the production is slick and the arrangement filled with drive" and that McCartney's "voice is as good as ever".  Record World said that "all the ingredients of a sure chart-topper are wrapped up in this delightful, fast moving number" with "awesome hooks." John Bergstrom of PopMatters called the song "an exemplary piece of mid-‘70s pop production and a pure pleasure".

In 2008, "Silly Love Songs" was listed at No. 31 on Billboard's Greatest Songs of All Time, commemorating the 50th anniversary of the Billboard Hot 100 chart.

Other recordings
In 1976, Wings recorded "Silly Love Songs" live for their triple live album Wings Over America. In 1984, three years after the dissolution of Wings, Paul McCartney re-recorded "Silly Love Songs" for the soundtrack to the motion picture Give My Regards to Broad Street.

Personnel
Personnel per The Paul McCartney Project

Wings
Paul McCartney – lead and backing vocals, bass, Mellotron, piano, string conductor, percussion
Linda McCartney – backing vocals, tambourine
Denny Laine – backing vocals, piano
Joe English – drums

Other musicians
Tony Dorsey – trombone
Thaddeus Richard – saxophone
Steve Howard – trumpet
Howie Casey – saxophone

Charts

Weekly charts

Year-end charts

All-time charts

Certifications

Ardijah version

In 1999, New Zealand music group group Ardijah released an R&B version of "Silly Love Songs". Their cover debuted at number 22 on New Zealand's RIANZ Singles Chart on 17 January 1999, rising to number nine the following week. It then moved up to number three, where it stayed for two weeks, and reached number one on 14 February, becoming the band's highest-charting single in their home country as well as their first top-10 hit since "Watchin' U" in 1988. "Silly Love Songs" logged 17 weeks on the New Zealand chart in total. Despite the song's success, it did not appear on New Zealand's year-end chart for 1999, nor did it receive any sales certifications.

Charts

Other covers
 In 1977, Welsh singer Shirley Bassey covered the song on her album You Take My Heart Away.
 In 1995, American rock band The Replicants covered the song on their self-titled album, with Maynard James Keenan on vocals.
 In 1996, rock group Red House Painters performed the song on their album Songs for a Blue Guitar.
 Wings band member Denny Laine covered "Silly Love Songs" on his album Wings at the Speed of Denny Laine.
 In 1998, American singer Stevie B recorded a version for his album Right Here, Right Now.
 In 2011, the song is featured in the Valentine's Day episode of Glee, which is also titled after the song. The song was performed by Darren Criss (who plays Blaine Anderson), while all-male a cappella group Beelzebubs sang the background vocals.
 In 2015, John Pizzarelli recorded the song on his album Midnight McCartney''.

See also
List of Hot 100 number-one singles of 1976 (U.S.)
List of number-one adult contemporary singles of 1976 (U.S.)
List of number-one singles from the 1990s (New Zealand)

Notes

References

External links
 Lyrics of this song

Bibliography

 

1976 songs
1976 singles
1999 singles
Paul McCartney songs
Paul McCartney and Wings songs
Billboard Hot 100 number-one singles
Cashbox number-one singles
Number-one singles in New Zealand
Capitol Records singles
Music published by MPL Music Publishing
British disco songs
Funk songs
Songs about music